William "Wild Bill" West (1875 – death date unknown) was an American Negro league pitcher in the 1900s and 1910s.

A native of Virginia, West played for the Leland Giants in 1908, and went on to play for the Indianapolis ABCs in 1911 and 1913.

References

External links
Baseball statistics and player information from Baseball-Reference Black Baseball Stats and Seamheads

1875 births
Year of death missing
Place of birth missing
Place of death missing
Indianapolis ABCs players
Leland Giants players
Baseball pitchers
Baseball players from Virginia